Micragrotis interstriata is a species of moth of the family Noctuidae first described by George Hampson in 1902. It is found in Africa, including Zimbabwe and South Africa.

External links
 
 

Noctuinae
Lepidoptera of the Democratic Republic of the Congo
Lepidoptera of South Africa
Lepidoptera of Zimbabwe
Moths of Sub-Saharan Africa